Billy Evangelista (born October 7, 1980) is an American former mixed martial artist. A professional from 2006 until 2014, he fought for World Extreme Cagefighting, Strikeforce, and the Palace Fighting Championship in his career.

Background
Evangelista was born and raised in Parlier, California and began wrestling when he was in the seventh grade. He continued at Parlier High School, where he was ranked #1 in his league as both a sophomore and junior. As a junior, he placed sixth in the Valley Championship, barely missing state qualifications. After graduating in 1999, he continued his wrestling career at Fresno City College for one season before enlisting in the United States Army in the Airborne Infantry division. He did a three-year tour and was based in Alaska. Six months prior to leaving the army, Evangelista was introduced to jiu-jitsu by his brother Jorge, who also wrestled at Fresno City College. After having his arm hyper-extended by a friend of his brother's, Evangelista fell in love with the sport and began training soon after.

Mixed martial arts career

Early career
Evangelista, who weighed 215 lbs, also began mixed martial arts as a way to lose weight. After compiling a 2-0 amateur MMA record, he made his professional MMA debut in January 2006. After a year away from the sport, he continued fighting in February 2007 when he made his debut for Strikeforce. During his career he trained under Jasper Tayaba at Team Buhawe and Javier Mendez at the American Kickboxing Academy.

Strikeforce
Over the next two years he amassed an impressive undefeated streak of 9-0.

Evangelista suffered his first recorded loss in a fight against Mike Aina at Strikeforce Challengers: Evangelista vs. Aina. He was originally disqualified for an alleged illegal knee strike to the head. However, replays showed it was a legal blow and the decision was eventually overturned by the California State Athletic Commission.

Evangelista would rebound from this controversial loss, defeating both Waachiim Spiritwolf and Jorge Gurgel via decision on Strikeforce Challengers shows. He eventually did suffer his first defeat via decision against Jorge Masvidal at Strikeforce: Feijao vs. Henderson.

Evangelista then faced K. J. Noons at Strikeforce: Melendez vs. Masvidal in December 2011. He lost the fight via unanimous decision.

After Strikeforce closed in January 2013, Evangelista was not among the fighters imported to the Ultimate Fighting Championship roster, having lost his last two Strikeforce bouts. He returned to action at The Warriors Cage: Conflict on June 21, 2013, finishing Josh Thornburg by TKO for his first stoppage win since 2008.

Mixed martial arts record

|-
| Loss
| align=center| 13–3 (1)
| Felipe Fogolin
| Submission (rear-naked choke)
| TWC 20: Isolation
| 
| align=center| 1
| align=center| 1:41
| Porterville, California, United States
| 
|-
| Win
| align=center| 13–2 (1)
| Josh Thornburg
| TKO (punches)
| TWC 17: Conflict
| 
| align=center| 3
| align=center| 1:31
| Porterville, California, United States
| 
|-
| Win
| align=center| 12–2 (1)
| Zak Bucia
| Decision (unanimous)
| UPC Unlimited: Up & Comers 15
| 
| align=center| 3
| align=center| 5:00
| Fresno, California, United States
|Welterweight debut.
|-
| Loss
| align=center| 11–2 (1)
| K. J. Noons
| Decision (unanimous)
| Strikeforce: Melendez vs. Masvidal
| 
| align=center| 3
| align=center| 5:00
| San Diego, California, United States
| 
|-
| Loss
| align=center| 11–1 (1)
| Jorge Masvidal
| Decision (unanimous)
| Strikeforce: Feijao vs. Henderson
| 
| align=center| 3
| align=center| 5:00
| Columbus, Ohio, United States
| 
|-
| Win
| align=center| 11–0 (1)
| Waachiim Spiritwolf
| Decision (unanimous)
| Strikeforce Challengers: Bowling vs. Voelker
| 
| align=center| 3
| align=center| 5:00
| Fresno, California, United States
| Catchweight (165 lbs) bout.
|-
| Win
| align=center| 10–0 (1)
| Jorge Gurgel
| Decision (unanimous)
| Strikeforce Challengers: Gurgel vs. Evangelista
| 
| align=center| 3
| align=center| 5:00
| Fresno, California, United States
| Catchweight (160 lbs) bout.
|-
| NC
| align=center| 9–0 (1)
| Mike Aina
| No Contest (overturned by CSAC)
| Strikeforce Challengers: Evangelista vs. Aina
| 
| align=center| 2
| align=center| 3:42
| Fresno, California, United States
| 
|-
| Win
| align=center| 9–0
| Harris Sarmiento
| Decision (unanimous)
| PFC 12: High Stakes
| 
| align=center| 3
| align=center| 3:00
| Lemoore, California, United States
| 
|-
| Win
| align=center| 8–0
| Luke Caudillo
| Decision (unanimous)
| Strikeforce: Payback
| 
| align=center| 3
| align=center| 5:00
| Denver, Colorado, United States
| 
|-
| Win
| align=center| 7–0
| Nam Phan
| Decision (split)
| Strikeforce: Melendez vs. Thomson
| 
| align=center| 3
| align=center| 5:00
| San Jose, California, United States
| 
|-
| Win
| align=center| 6–0
| Marlon Sims
| KO (punch)
| Strikeforce: Shamrock vs. Le
| 
| align=center| 3
| align=center| 0:39
| San Jose, California, United States
|Catchweight (163 lbs) bout.
|-
| Win
| align=center| 5–0
| Clint Coronel
| Decision (split)
| Strikeforce: Playboy Mansion
| 
| align=center| 3
| align=center| 5:00
| Beverly Hills, California, United States
| 
|-
| Win
| align=center| 4–0
| Ryan Bixler
| Decision (unanimous)
| Melee on the Mountain
| 
| align=center| 5
| align=center| 5:00
| Friant, California, United States
| 
|-
| Win
| align=center| 3–0
| Alexander Crispim
| TKO (punches)
| Gladiator Challenge 61
| 
| align=center| 3
| align=center| 3:48
| San Francisco, California, United States
| 
|-
| Win
| align=center| 2–0
| Isaiah Hill
| TKO (punches)
| Strikeforce: Young Guns
| 
| align=center| 1
| align=center| 1:39
| San Jose, California, United States
| 
|-
| Win
| align=center| 1–0
| Ryan Healy
| TKO (punches and elbows)
| WEC 18: Unfinished Business
| 
| align=center| 2
| align=center| 2:06
| Lemoore, California, United States
|

See also
 List of Strikeforce alumni

References

External links

Living people
American male mixed martial artists
Mixed martial artists from California
Lightweight mixed martial artists
Mixed martial artists utilizing wrestling
Mixed martial artists utilizing Brazilian jiu-jitsu
American mixed martial artists of Mexican descent
American practitioners of Brazilian jiu-jitsu
1980 births
Fresno City College alumni
People from Parlier, California